Ruben Sergio Rojas (born 22 November 1973 in Buenos Aires, Argentina) is an Argentine former professional footballer who played as a striker. After retiring as a player, he worked as a scout for Tours FC in South America.

References

External links
 
 
 Sergio Rojas at BDFA.com.ar 

1973 births
Living people
Association football forwards
Argentine footballers
Argentine expatriate footballers
R. Charleroi S.C. players
Grenoble Foot 38 players
Belgian Pro League players
Ligue 2 players
Textil Mandiyú footballers
Expatriate footballers in Belgium
Expatriate footballers in France
Footballers from Buenos Aires